The D River is a river in Lincoln City, Oregon, United States.

World record dispute

The world's shortest title was lost in 1989 when Guinness named the Roe River in Montana as the world's shortest. Attempting to reclaim the title, the people of Lincoln City submitted a new measurement to Guinness of about  marked at "extreme high tide". At that time, Lincoln City's Chamber of Commerce described the Roe as a "drainage ditch surveyed for a school project". Guinness apparently never ruled on the dispute, leaving the claim by the Roe to stand, but instead, starting in 2006, chose to no longer list the shortest river, possibly because of this ongoing dispute.

Geography
The D River flows from Devils Lake, under U.S. Route 101, and into the Pacific Ocean, entirely within the city limits of Lincoln City. The D River State Recreation Site off Highway 101 is home to two of the world's largest kite festivals in the summer and fall.

This area was originally settled as the town of Delake, which was later incorporated with other nearby towns to form Lincoln City in 1965. The river had been known by several names, including simply "the outlet", and earned its short name in a contest.

See also
List of rivers of Oregon

References

External links

Devils Lake Water Improvement District

Rivers of Lincoln County, Oregon
Lincoln City, Oregon
Rivers of Oregon